The 2013 FC Tokyo season is FC Tokyo's 2nd season back in the J. League Division 1 since the unexpected relegation in the 2010 season. They also competed in the 2013 J. League Cup and 2013 Emperor's Cup.

Trophies balance

Competitive Balance

Winter transfers

In

Out

Loan in

Loan out

Loan return

Loan end

Current squad
As of February 14, 2013

Match stats
Updated to 29 December 2013

(*) One Own-Goal

Match results

Pre-season

Friendly matches

J. League

 Win   Draw   Lost

 J. League Winner (also qualified for 2014 AFC Champions League Group Stage)
 2014 AFC Champions League Group Stage
 Relegation to J. League 2

J. League Cup

Group stage

Group B

Emperor's Cup

Second Round

Third Round

Fourth Round

Quarterfinals

Semifinals

References 

FC Tokyo
2013